Goniocera is a genus of flies in the family Tachinidae.

Species
G. io (Aldrich, 1929)
G. montium (Villeneuve, 1921)
G. schistacea Brauer & von Bergenstamm, 1891
G. versicolor (Fallén, 1820)

References

Tachininae
Tachinidae genera
Taxa named by Friedrich Moritz Brauer
Taxa named by Julius von Bergenstamm